Jasenov Del is a village in the municipality of Babušnica, Serbia. According to the 2002 census, the village has a population of 198 people.

References

Populated places in Pirot District
Bulgarian communities in Serbia